Orphan School Creek is a storm drain located in inner Sydney, New South Wales. It is a tributary of Johnstons Creek which flows into Rozelle Bay.

The creek moves through the University of Sydney and in particular in St John's college oval, at the back of Royal Prince Alfred Hospital. An old photo of Royal Prince Alfred Hospital shows the creek prior to it being turned into a storm water drain.

Much of the course of the old creek is part of a green link of parks.

See also 

Whites Creek
Johnstons Creek
Prospect Creek

References

External links
Orphan School Creek at the City of Sydney

Creeks and canals of Sydney
City of Fairfield